The Ferrari 499P is a sports prototype built by Scuderia Ferrari to compete in the FIA World Endurance Championship in the Le Mans Hypercar category. The car was unveiled at the Ferrari Finali Mondiali, Ferrari's annual finale for their one-make series, Ferrari Challenge. The introduction of the 499P marks 50 years since Ferrari last fielded a factory-backed sports prototype that contested for the overall win at the 24 Hours of Le Mans, and as a tribute, one of the 499Ps will race with the number 50. The car is scheduled to debut at the season-opening round of the 2023 FIA World Endurance Championship, the 2023 1000 Miles of Sebring, after carrying out a series of tests on this circuit.

Specifications
The 499P's  twin-turbocharged V6 engine architecture is shared with the Ferrari 296 and its Group GT3 counterpart, the 296 GT3. However, instead of being mounted to the subframe in the road-going vehicle, the engine now serves as a fully stressed member in the 499P, and has had various modifications to accommodate its new role as a stress-bearing member. The aerodynamics of the 499P were developed in conjunction with Ferrari's Styling Centre, headed by Flavio Manzoni, under Ferdinando Cannizzo, head of Ferrari's sports car engineering department. The car, as per the Le Mans Hypercar regulations, does not feature the standardised parts such as the ones found in cars designed to the Le Mans Daytona h regulations, cars which the 499P will be racing alongside.

Racing results

Complete World Endurance Championship results
(key) Races in bold indicates pole position. Races in italics indicates fastest lap.

* Season still in progress.

References

External links
 

Cars introduced in 2022
499P
Le Mans Hypercars
24 Hours of Le Mans race cars
Sports prototypes
Rear mid-engine, all-wheel-drive vehicles